Vimmerby HC (often referred to as Vimmerby Hockey) is a Swedish ice hockey club based in Vimmerby which was promoted to Division 1, the third tier of ice hockey in Sweden, in 2011.  , Vimmerby plays in group E in Division 1.

External links
 Official website
 Profile on Eliteprospects.com

Ice hockey teams in Sweden
Ice hockey clubs established in 1993
1993 establishments in Sweden
Ice hockey teams in Kalmar County